"Pick Up Your Feelings" is a song by American singer Jazmine Sullivan, released on November 20, 2020 as the second single from her debut extended play (EP), Heaux Tales (2021). The song was written by Sullivan, Audra Mae, Kyle Coleman, Michael Holmes, Brittany Coney, Denisia Andrews and produced by the latter three. At the 64th Annual Grammy Awards, the song received two nominations for Best R&B Song and Best R&B Performance, winning the latter in a tie with "Leave the Door Open" by Silk Sonic.

Charts

Year-end charts

Certifications

Release history

References

2020 singles
2020 songs
Jazmine Sullivan songs
Songs written by Jazmine Sullivan
RCA Records singles